Wings of the Falcon is a thriller, historical romance novel by Barbara Michaels published originally in 1977.

The novel tells the story of Francesca who becomes entangled with the mysterious Il Falcone in a political plot in midst of Italian Revolution of 1860.

Synopsis

Set during  Italian Risorgimento  of  1860, Francesca Fairbourn arrives in Italy after she becomes an orphan to live with her mother's family.
Her aristocratic Italian mother and English father had eloped which resulted in her getting disowned by her family. Francesca's mother died during her birth which left Francesca's father to raise her all alone. When she left school at 18 she lost her father and was in desperate situation until her dashing young cousin Andrea del Tarconti rescues her and sends her to Italy to the aristocratic home of Tarconti Castle. Once there Francesca finds herself intertwined in web of political intrigue as a local disguised hero named Il Falcone is helping peasants fight against tyrant rulers. Francesca realizes that the 'Il Falcone' is closer to her family than she thinks.

Characters

Francesca Fairbourn - 18-year-old Francesca who comes to live with her mother's family in Italy. There she becomes entangled in the Italian Revolution and with the mysterious Il Falcone. The protagonist and narrator.
Stefano del Tarconti - Francesca's second half-cousin who is limp due to horse accident. Elder twin brother of Andrea, he is direct in line to Tarconti title and estate.
Alberta "Miss P" Perkins - The Governess who accompanies Francesca from England to Italy. Extremely chatty but it is all a facade as she is actually an English Spy who has come to Italy to help Il Falcone fight against tyrant rulers.
Miss Rhoda - Stefano and Andrea's Grandmother's sister. She raised Stefano and Andrea since they were children.
Andrea del Tarconti - Stefano's younger twin brother who is dashing and impulsive.
Conte del Tarconti - Grandfather of Franceca, Stefano and Andrea who is current Prince Tarconti.
Galiana Fosilini - young but spoiled Galiana is daughter of Constessa Fosilini.  Becomes good friend of Francesca.
Contessa Fosilini - Wife of late Count Fosilini who was to be married to Franceca's mother until she ran away with Franseca's father Charles. Contessa is usually quiet, frail and very religious person.
Raoul De Merode - The local captain soldier and novel's main antagonist. Obsessed with want to defeat Il Falcone.
Francesca del Tarconti - Francesca's mother who died during her birth. She was disowned by her rich aristocrat Italian Family when she ran away with Charles to England. Francesca's is named after her.
Charles Fairbourn - Franceca's English father who is extremely handsome. He loves his daughter very much and provides her with every happiness.
Teresa - Franceca's maid who is generally helpful and brave.

References
Wings of Falcon Harper Collins Edition

1977 novels
Historical novels
American thriller novels
Fiction set in 1860
Italian unification
Novels set in Italy
Dodd, Mead & Co. books
American romance novels